Lecithocera pulchella is a moth in the family Lecithoceridae first described by Kyu-Tek Park in 1999. It is found in Taiwan.

The wingspan is 17–18 mm. The forewings are relatively broad. The ground color is yellowish orange, sparsely suffused with dark-brown scales beyond two thirds length. There are two well defined discal spots, the inner one near the middle and a bigger distal one at the end of the cell. The hindwings are grey.

Etymology
The species name is derived from the Latin pulcher (meaning beautiful).

References

Moths described in 1999
pulchella